The ZO sex-determination system is a system that determines the sex of offspring in several moths. In those species, there is one sex chromosome, Z. Males have two Z chromosomes, whereas females have one Z. Males are ZZ, while females are ZO.

See also 
Y-chromosomal Adam
Sex Determination in Silene
 Sex-determination system
 Sexual differentiation
 Haplodiploid sex-determination system
 XY sex-determination system
 XO sex-determination system
 ZW sex-determination system
 Temperature-dependent sex determination
 X chromosome
 Y chromosome

References

Sex-determination systems
Lepidopterology
Chromosomes
Insects
Moths